South Scanian Regiment, designation P 7, is a Swedish Army armoured regiment that traces its origins back to 1811. It was converted from an infantry regiment in 1963 and renamed from South Scania Infantry Regiment. The regiment's soldiers were originally recruited from the region of Scania (Skåne), and it is currently garrisoned in Revingehed outside Lund, in Skåne County.

History
The regiment was converted from an infantry regiment to an armored regiment in 1963 and was given the name South Scanian Regiment. In 1982, the regiment carried out a major reorganization when all training activities were transferred to Revingehed and the Scanian Anti-Aircraft Corps (Lv 4) moved into the barracks in Ystad.

Barracks and training areas

Barracks
On 1 January 1928, the regiment, which was originally an infantry regiment, took over the barracks area on Dragongatan in Ystad, which until 31 December 1927 belonged to the Scanian Dragoon Regiment (K 6). The barracks area was built in 1897, and following the 1892 Regimental Building Program, and originally consisted of two cavalry barracks. After the Defence Reform of 1901, additional barracks were built in the area, which were designed by Erik Josephson. Until 1982, the regiment conducted training in both Ystad and Revingehed. On 26 May 1982, a farewell ceremony was held in Ystad, and on 10 June the entire training battalion was deployed to Revingehed.

From 1 July 1982, most of the barracks establishment was taken over by the Scanian Anti-Aircraft Regiment (Lv 4), which were relocated from Malmö. On 31 December 1997, the South Scanian Regiment and the Scanian Anti-Aircraft Regiment were disbanded. The entire barracks area, which then consisted of roughly 40 buildings, was then sold to Ystad Municipality, and was later declared listed buildings. Since 1 July 1982, the regiment is located at Revingehed.

Traning areas
Over the years, the regiment has had its primary training area at Revingehed, which was put into use in 1888. The training area covered approximately 20 hectares in 1887, but was expanded to 100 hectares in 1888. During World War II, the training area was expanded to 1,000 hectares. Since the regiment was reorganized into an armored regiment, the training area was expanded to 4,400 hectares, and with it became Sweden's largest armored training area. Kabusa training area has also belonged to the regiment since the 1940s. The Kabusa training area was expanded in 1943 and 1971.

Through the decommissioning that was done through the various defence acts in the 1990s and 2000s, it has meant that the regiment has added administrative responsibility over a number of training areas in southern Sweden. In addition to the Revingehed and Kabusa, includes since 1 July 2000 Norra Åsum, Björka, Ravlunda and Rinkaby training areas, which were taken over from the Scanian Dragoon Regiment (P 2).

Heraldry and traditions

Colours, standards and guidons
South Scanian Regiment presents one regimental colour and one regimental standard.

Colour of South Scanian Regiment
The colour was presented to the then South Scanian Regiment and South Scanian Brigade (MekB 7) at Revingehed by His Majesty the King Carl XVI Gustaf on 26 April 1998. It is used only as regimental colour since 1 July 2000. The colour is drawn by Kristina Holmgård-Åkerberg and embroidered by machine and hand in insertion technique by Maj-Britt Salander/company Blå Kusten. Blazon: "On yellow cloth the provincial badge of Scania; an erazed red head of a griffin with an open blue crown. In the first corner the badge of the Air Defence Corps; two winged red gunbarrels of an older pattern in saltire (a legacy from the former Royal Scanian Anti-Aircraft Regiment (Lv 4)."

Standard of South Scanian Regiment
The standard was presented to the former Scanian Dragoon Regiment (P 2) at the Stockholm Palace in Stockholm by His Majesty the King Carl XVI Gustaf on 1 October 1992. It was used as regimental standard by P 2 up to 30 June 2000 and then as brigade standard by the Scanian Dragoon Brigade (MekB 8) until 1 July 2000. The standard is drawn by Ingrid Lamby and embroidered by machine in insertion technique by the company Libraria and Gunilla Hjort. Blazon: "On yellow cloth the badge of the regiment; an erazed black head of a griffin with an open red crown. On a black border at the upper side of the standard, battle honours (Lund 1676, Landskrona 1677, Kliszow 1702, Pultusk 1703, Punitz 1704, Fraustadt 1706, Rajovka 1708, Bornhöft 1813) in yellow. Yellow fringe.

Coat of arms
The coat of the arms of the South Scanian Regiment (P 7/Fo 11) 1977–1994, the South Scania Brigade (MekB 7) 1994–2000 and the 
South Scanian Regiment (P 7) since 2000. Blazon: "Or, the provincial badge of Scania, an erazed head of a griffin gules, with open crown and arms azure. The shield surmounted two arms in fess, embowed and vambraced, the hands holding swords in saltire, or". The coat of arms of the South Scanian Regiment (P 7/Fo 11) 1994–2000 and the South Scania Group since 2000. Blazon: "Or, the provincial badge of Scania, an erazed head of a griffin gules, with an open crown azure. The shield surmounted two swords in saltire or".

Medals
Before 1987, it was called  ("South Scanian Regiment and Malmö Defence District Medal of Merit") (SödskånregGM/SM/BM) and before 1999 it was called  ("South Scanian Regiment and South Scanian Brigade") (SödskånregbrigGM/SM/BM). Today it is called  ("South Scanian Regiment (P 7) Medal of Merit"). The medal ribbon is of yellow moiré with a red stripe on each side.

Commanding officers
Regimental commanders active from when the regiment was organized as an armored unit. For regimental commanders before 1963, see South Scania Infantry Regiment. For the years 1998-2000, see South Scanian Regiment and South Scanian Brigade

1962–1968: Carl Eric Svärd
1968–1972: Gösta Hökmark
1972–1975: Bertil Green
1976–1978: Claes Carlsten
1978–1986: Bertil Green
1986–1988: Sven-Åke Jansson
1988–1995: Gert Nilsson
1995–1997: Christer Sterning
1997–1997: Gunnar Jansson (acting)
1998–2000: See South Scanian Regiment and South Scanian Brigade
2000–2004: Anders Emanuelson
2004–2007: Lars Hammarlund
2007–2011: Jan Pålsson
2011–2015: Michael Nilsson (from 2012 also commanding officer (CO) of Military Region South (MR S))
2015–2015: Peter Nilsson (also acting CO of MR S)
2015–2017: Stefan Smedman (also CO of MR S)
2017–2018: Peter Nilsson (also acting CO of MR S in 2017)
2018–2020: Bo Stennabb
2020–2021: Magnus Olsson (acting)
2021–present: Lennart Widerström

Names, designations and locations

See also
 List of Swedish armoured regiments

Footnotes

References

Notes

Print

Web

Further reading

External links

 

Armored regiments of the Swedish Army
Military units and formations established in 1963
Military units and formations disestablished in 1997
Military units and formations established in 2000
1963 establishments in Sweden
1997 disestablishments in Sweden
2000 establishments in Sweden
Ystad Garrison